is a private museum in Nagoya. It is the only museum that specializes specifically in mandolins in the world.

History 
Mandolin Melodies Museum was founded by mandolin player Hirokazu Nanya in a renovated pharmacy. The museum opened on May 8, 1995. It features Nanya's collection of mandolin LP and EP records, CD's, and 20 mandolins, dating from the 1920s to present. Notable holdings include mandolins owned by Gaetano Vinaccia, an Italian luthier, and Masakichi Suzuki, the first person in Japan to build a mandolin.

The records and CD's exhibited at the museum can be listened to for a fee.

References

Bibliography

External links 

 Official website 

Museums in Nagoya
Musical instrument museums
Coordinates on Wikidata
Museums established in 1995